Copper(0)-mediated reversible-deactivation radical polymerization (Cu(0)-mediated RDRP) is a member of the class of reversible-deactivation radical polymerization. As the name implies, metallic copper is employed as the transition-metal catalyst for reversible activation/deactivation of the propagating chains responsible for uniform polymer chain growth.

History of Copper-mediated RDRP 
Although copper complexes (in combination with relevant ligands) have long been used as catalysts for organic reactions such as atom transfer radical addition (ATRA) and copper(I)-catalyzed alkyne-azide cycloaddition (CuAAC), copper complex catalyzed RDRP was not reported until 1995 when Jin-Shan Wang and Krzysztof Matyjaszewski introduced it as atom transfer radical polymerization (ATRP). ATRP with copper as catalyst quickly became one of the most robust and commonly used RDRP techniques for designing and synthesizing polymers with well-defined composition, functionalities, and architecture. Due to some inherited drawbacks, such the persistent radical effect (PRE), several advanced ATRP techniques have been developed, including activators regenerated by electron transfer (ARGET) ATRP and initiators for continuous activator regeneration (ICAR) ATRP.

One intriguing catalyst, metallic copper, has also been applied to these modified ATRP systems. The polymerization using Cu(0) and suitable ligands was introduced for the first time by Krzysztof Matyjaszewski in 1997. However, then, in 2006, the Cu(0) – mediated RDRP of MA (in combination with tris(2-(dimethylamino)ethyl)amine(Me6TREN) as ligand in polar solvents) was reported, with a very different mechanism, single electron transfer living radical polymerization (SET-LRP) postulated by Virgil Percec. Initiated by this mechanistic difference, many research articles were published during recent years which aimed to shed a light on this specific polymerization reaction, and the discussion of the mechanisms has been a very striking episode in the field of polymer science.

Discussion of the mechanism

Supplemental activator and reducing agent atom-transfer radical polymerization (SARA ATRP)
In the case of RDRP reactions in the presence of Cu(0), one of the mechanistic models proposed in the literature is called the supplemental activator and reducing agent atom-transfer radical polymerization (SARA ATRP). The SARA ATRP is characterized by the traditional ATRP reactions of activation by Cu(I) and deactivation by Cu(II) at the core of the process, with Cu(0) acting primarily as a supplemental activator of alkyl halides and a reducing agent for the Cu(II) through comproportionation. There is minimal kinetic contribution of disproportionation because Cu(I) primarily activates alkyl halides and activation of all alkyl halides occurs by inner sphere electron transfer (ISET).

Single electron transfer living radical polymerization (SET-LRP)
Another model is called single-electron transfer living radical polymerization (SET-LRP), where Cu(0) is the exclusive activator of alkyl halides – a process that occurs by outer sphere electron transfer (OSET). The generated Cu(I) disproportionates ‘spontaneously’ into highly reactive ‘nascent’ Cu(0) and Cu(II) species, instead of participating in the activation of alkyl halides, and there is minimal comproportionation.

Copper(0)-mediated reversible-deactivation radical polymerization (Cu(0)-mediated RDRP)
One unique experimental phenomenon in the Cu(0)-mediated RDRP systems with Me6TREN/DMSO as ligand/solvent is that the existence of an apparent induction period in the early stage and the absence of this induction period was observed by adding extra Cu(II) to the reaction system or employing PMDETA as ligand. This intriguing phenomenon cannot be explained either by SARA ATRP or SET-LRP, therefore, another mechanism was proposed by Wenxin Wang: copper(0)-mediated reversible-deactivation radical polymerization (Cu(0)-mediated RDRP).

The Cu(0)-mediated RDRP mechanism showed that induction period is originated from the accumulation of soluble copper species during that initial unstable stage. It was demonstrated that Cu(I) act as a powerful activator even under conditions favoring its disproportionation (in Me6TREN/DMSO system), whilst  Cu(0) is a supplemental activator and reducing agent and both disproportionation and comproportionation coexist. Cu(II) can be consumed by both the comproportionation and deactivation reaction, the relative extent of which depends on the reactivity of monomers and initiators. 

In Cu(0)-mediated RDRP, two equilibriums coexist under real polymerization conditions – 1) mutual conversion of different copper species which determines the relative concentration of Cu(I) and Cu(II), and 2) polymerization equilibrium which is the combination of activation/deactivation, propagation and termination processes. The synergistic effects of different parameters on both of these equilibria should be considered together, which is crucial to understand the existence of the induction period and the controllability of Cu(0)-mediated RDRP of vinyl monomers with different reactivities.

Wang et al. has demonstrated that different polymerization parameters including the initiator, solvent, ligand, and the amount of deactivator can affect the controllability of the whole polymerization process by influencing these two equilibriums. Through considering both the mutual conversion among different copper species and the polymerization equilibrium, the optimal reaction conditions were selected for the realization of the well-controlled Cu(0)-mediated RDRPs of methyl methacrylate (MMA) and styrene which are difficult to polymerize based on either the SET-LRP or the SARA ATRP mechanism. The general trends are: for instance, the Cu(0)-mediated RDRP of MMA, either an initiator with relatively low reactivity combined with a higher amount of Cu(II) or a more highly reactive initiator and a lower amount of Cu(II) are needed to achieve the controlled polymerization. The mechanism could be attributed to that the lower kp results in a slower establishment of polymerization equilibrium and longer time for copper mutual conversion at the early stage of polymerization. Thus, the small amount of extra Cu(II) added is mostly consumed in the comproportionation process rather than acting as extra deactivator, contributing to the kinetic control.

See also
 Reversible-deactivation radical polymerization
 Atom-transfer radical-polymerization

References

Polymerization reactions